Cogra Bay is a suburb of the Central Coast region of New South Wales, Australia, located on the north bank of the Hawkesbury River   north of Sydney. It is part of the  local government area.

Cogra Bay is bounded by the Hawkesbury River to the south, the mouth of the Mooney Mooney Creek to the west, Mullet Creek to the east, and the Brisbane Water National Park to the north. It consists of a number of properties accessible only by boat or by water taxi less than 10 minutes from Brooklyn on the southern side of the Hawkesbury River. Although, due to shallow water in some parts of the bay, there may be limited access at low tide. Cogra Bay residents enjoy an off-grid lifestyle, using solar power and rain water tank storage. The nearest railway stations are Brooklyn and Wondabyne.

References

Further reading
 

 
Suburbs of the Central Coast (New South Wales)
Bays of New South Wales
Hawkesbury River